Ananias Djalma da Silva Júnior (born 17 April 1990), commonly known as Júnior Silva, is a former Brazilian footballer.

Career statistics

Club

Notes

References

1990 births
Living people
Brazilian footballers
Association football defenders
Association football midfielders
Esporte Clube Pelotas players
Porto Alegre Futebol Clube players
Grêmio Esportivo Glória players
Riograndense Futebol Clube players